The 1897 Delaware football team was an American football team that represented Delaware College (later renamed the University of Delaware) as an independent during the 1897 college football season. Led by first-year head coach Herbert Rice, the team posted a 1−5–1 record.

Schedule

References

Delaware
Delaware Fightin' Blue Hens football seasons
Delaware football